The All Japan Bobsleigh Championships are annual bobsledding championships organized by the Japan Bobsleigh and Luge Federation (JBLF) at the Spiral in Nagano, Japan. They were first held in 1938.

2-person champions

4-person champions

References
All Japan Bobsleigh Championships at Nagano Bobsleigh, Luge & Skeleton Federation 

Bobsleigh competitions
Bobsleigh in Japan
Annual sporting events in Japan
1938 establishments in Japan
Recurring sporting events established in 1938
National championships in Japan